Jermaine Franklin is an American professional boxer.

Early life
Franklin was born in Saginaw, Michigan where he spent most of his time growing up.

Professional boxing career
Franklin fought Dillian Whyte the Wembley Arena, London, England on the November 26, 2022 and Whyte won by majority decision, although the decision of that fight was controversial with many scoring the fight as a draw or for Franklin winning.

A bout between Franklin and Anthony Joshua is scheduled to take place on April 1, 2023.

Professional boxing record

References

Living people
American boxers
Year of birth missing (living people)